The barbelthroat carpetshark (Cirrhoscyllium expolitum) is a carpetshark of the family Parascylliidae found in the South China Sea between Luzon in the Philippines and China, between latitudes 23°N and 10°N, at depths between 180 and 190 m.  Its length is up to 34 cm.

Reproduction is oviparous.

References
 
 Compagno, Dando, & Fowler, Sharks of the World, Princeton University Press, New Jersey 2005 

barbelthroat carpetshark
South China Sea
Marine fish of Southeast Asia
barbelthroat carpetshark